The men's 1500 metres competition at the 1998 Asian Games in Bangkok, Thailand was held on 13–14 December at the Thammasat Stadium.

Schedule
All times are Indochina Time (UTC+07:00)

Results

Heats
 Qualification: First 4 in each heat (Q) and the next 4 fastest (q) advance to the final.

Heat 1

Heat 2

Final

References

External links
Results

Men's 01500 metres
1998